The Gulf Coast Premier League (GCPL) is a United States Adult Soccer Association affiliated Amateur Elite League that includes teams from Alabama, Florida, Louisiana, Mississippi and Texas. The regular season of the GCPL runs May through July. On August 13, 2020, it was announced that the GCPL would be the first "amateur league affiliation" of the National Independent Soccer Association after Gaffa FC and Louisiana Krewe FC competed in the NISA 2020 Independent Cup.

Louisiana Premier League
The Louisiana Premier League was formed in 2014 by the Louisiana Soccer Association's Adult Committee members, Jonathan Rednour and Chad Vidrine, with the assistance of Pool Boys FC founder, Jeremy Poklemba. The recent success of a similar formatted competition, administered by the LSA, in the spring of 2014 and the emergence of newly formed clubs, Pool Boys FC and Cajun Soccer Club, along with the interest from Motagua New Orleans from the ISLANO league, offered an opportunity to create a statewide elite amateur league. Motagua New Orleans won the inaugural season, defeating Cajun Soccer Club in the finals, 4–2.

On March 8, 2016, the Louisiana Premier League was granted Elite Amateur League status by the United States Adult Soccer Association.

Gulf Coast Premier League
On August 1, 2016, the Louisiana Premier League, sanctioned and operated by the Louisiana Soccer Association, folded to make way for the newly formed Gulf Coast Premier League. The league formed as a non-profit organization expanding itself to clubs outside Louisiana along the gulf coast.

In January 2017 the league announced three expansion teams, expanding the league footprint into Alabama and Florida. Central Texas Lobos FC were announced as a future member in June 2017.

Developmental League
A 4-team developmental league called the Gulf Coast Development League (GCDL) was announced and began play in May 2019.

2020 Fall Tournament Showcase
The League announced it would cancel its 2020 regular season due to the coronavirus epidemic but left open the possibility of a fall competition. In October 2020 the League announced the Fall Tournament Showcase featuring 5 teams: Pool Boys FC, Louisiana Krewe FC, Crescent City FC, Mobile United FC and new addition 14th Ward FC.

Great Plains Premier League
In 2019, the GCPL announced the creation of the Great Plains Premier League (GPPL), an expansion conference/sister league with teams to be based in the Dakotas, Nebraska, Iowa, Kansas or Missouri. The GPPL was set to begin play in 2020 however the COVID-19 pandemic halted plans. Nebraska Bugeaters FC, was their only announced club.

Teams

Former Teams

AFC Mobile (Mobile) (2017–2019, moved to National Premier Soccer League) 
BOCA FC (Shreveport) (2015–2019)
Gulf Coast Rangers FC (Fairhope) (2017–2023, merged with Mobile United FC to form Union 10 FC.
Hattiesburg FC (Hattiesburg) (2019–2020)
Lake City Gamblers (Lake Charles) (2014–2017) 
Louisiana Fire (New Orleans) (2016–2017)
Louisiana Krewe FC (Lafayette) (2018–2021, moved to USL League Two)
Mobile United FC (Mobile) (2021–2022, merged with Gulf Coast Rangers FC to form Union 10 FC.
Motagua New Orleans (New Orleans) (2014–2019)
FC New Orleans (New Orleans) (2019)
New Orleans United (New Orleans) (2021) 
Northshore United (Covington) (2017-2021) 
Nicholls State University Club (Thibodaux) (2014–2015)
Mississippi Blues FC (Jackson) (2018–2020)
Port City FC (Gulfport) (2016–2019, moved to National Premier Soccer League)
Real United Riverhawks FC (Moss Point) (2018)
Red River FC (Minden, Louisiana) (2021)
Shreveport Rafters FC B (2016–2017)
Tallahassee SC (Tallahassee) (2019, moved to National Premier Soccer League)

Seasons

References

External links 
 Gulf Coast Premier League website

 
United States Adult Soccer Association leagues
Soccer in Mississippi
Soccer in Louisiana
2014 establishments in Louisiana
Sports leagues established in 2014
Soccer in Texas
Soccer in Florida